Samantha Leshnak Murphy (born April 21, 1997) is an American professional soccer player who plays as a goalkeeper.

Career
In April 2019, she signed as a goalkeeper replacement with North Carolina Courage.

Murphy received national attention at a match against the Portland Thorns FC in June 2020. At this match, Murphy chose not to kneel during the national anthem which drew praise and criticism on social media.

Personal life
In June 2019, she married her husband, Kyle Murphy.

Honors
North Carolina Courage
 NWSL Championship: 2019
 NWSL Shield: 2019

References

External links
 
 North Carolina Courage profile

1997 births
Living people
People from Butler County, Ohio
American women's soccer players
North Carolina Tar Heels women's soccer players
North Carolina Courage players
National Women's Soccer League players
Keflavík women's football players
Women's association football goalkeepers
American expatriate women's soccer players
American expatriate sportspeople in Iceland
Expatriate women's footballers in Iceland